Çağlayancerit is a town and district of Kahramanmaraş Province in the Mediterranean region of Turkey.

Etymology
The name of the district comes from the Turkoman tribe of Jerid.

2009 helicopter crash 

On March 25, 2009, Great Union Party's (BBP) leader Muhsin Yazıcıoğlu came to Çağlayancerit at 13:00 EET (11:00 UCT) by a chartered helicopter to hold a speech at his party's rally ahead of the local elections. After the rally at the town's square before 1,500 people gathered, he left at 14:42 local time with the same helicopter carrying his party's three other local politicians and a reporter to head for another rally in Yerköy, Yozgat Province.

The helicopter crashed at Mount Keş in Göksun district killing the pilot and four passengers, among them Yazıcıoğlu. The reporter survived with injuries and made an emergency call reporting the accident. Subsequent search and rescue operations, conducted by thousands of people and assisted by several helicopters, succeeded to recover the wreckage and the five bodies only three days later due to advert weather conditions in the region. The reporter's corpse was finally found two more days later far from the crash site.

See also 
Düzbağ - a town in the district

References

External links
 District governor's official website 

Populated places in Kahramanmaraş Province
Districts of Kahramanmaraş Province
Çağlayancerit District
Towns in Turkey